Cacolac is a milk-based drink created in 1954 in Bordeaux, France by the Lanneluc and Lauseig families. Throughout France, it is available in about 70% of all cafés, hotels, and restaurants. Since 1978, it has also been available in grocery stores in glass bottles and cans.

Producer
The food company Cacolac is still  directed by the family of the creators. It employs twenty-eight people, and the manufacturing plant has been located in Léognan, in the Gironde department in Aquitaine since 2000. It also distributes the products by itself.

Recipe
Contrary to popular belief, Cacolac is simply chocolate milk, although it has a different flavor to it. The nutritional value of this drink is low, and it can be drunk either hot or cold.

Marketing
The company was offered free publicity almost daily for some time. In fact, the puppet footballer Jean-Pierre Papin of Les Guignols was presented as a big fan of the drink. Danone had tried to market the fresh version of the drink by investing heavily in advertising campaigns, but had little success.

External links
 objectif-aquitaine.com
 Official site of the drink
 Web site of the franchise

French drinks